In astrophysics the chirp mass of a compact binary system determines the leading-order orbital evolution of the system as a result of energy loss from emitting gravitational waves. Because the gravitational wave frequency is determined by orbital frequency, the chirp mass also determines the frequency evolution of the gravitational wave signal emitted during a binary's inspiral phase. In gravitational wave data analysis it is easier to measure the chirp mass than the two component masses alone.

Definition from component masses

A two-body system with component masses  and  has a chirp mass of

The chirp mass may also be expressed in terms of the total mass of the system  and other common mass parameters:
 the reduced mass :
 	
 the mass ratio :
  or
 the symmetric mass ratio :
 
 The symmetric mass ratio reaches its maximum value  when , and thus 
 the geometric mean of the component masses :
 
 If the two component masses are roughly similar, then the latter factor is close to  so . This multiplier decreases for unequal component masses but quite slowly.  E.g. for a 3:1 mass ratio it becomes , while for a 10:1 mass ratio it is

Orbital evolution

In general relativity, the phase evolution of a binary orbit can be computed using a post-Newtonian expansion, a perturbative expansion in powers of the orbital velocity .  The first order gravitational wave frequency, evolution is described by the differential equation

,

If one is able to measure both the frequency  and frequency derivative  of a gravitational wave signal, the chirp mass can be determined.

To disentangle the individual component masses in the system one must additionally measure higher order terms in the post-Newtonian expansion.

Mass-redshift degeneracy 

One limitation of the chirp mass is that it is affected by redshift; what is actually derived from the observed gravitational waveform is the product
 
where  is the redshift.  This redshifted chirp mass is larger than the source chirp mass, and can only be converted to a source chirp mass by finding the redshift .

This is usually resolved by using the observed amplitude to find the chirp mass divided by distance, and solving both equations using Hubble's law to compute the relationship between distance and redshift.

Xian Chen has pointed out that this assumes non-cosmological redshifts (peculiar velocity and gravitational redshift) are negligible, and questions this assumption.  If a binary pair of stellar-mass black holes merge while closely orbiting a supermassive black hole (an extreme mass ratio inspiral), the observed gravitational wave would experience significant gravitational and doppler redshift, leading to a falsely low redshift estimate, and therefore a falsely high mass.  He suggests that there are plausible reasons to suspect that the SMBH's accretion disc and tidal forces would enhance the merger rate of black hole binaries near it, and the consequent falsely high mass estimates would explain the unexpectedly large masses of observed black hole mergers.  (The question would be best resolved by a lower-frequency gravitational wave detector such as LISA which could observe the EMRI waveform.)

See also 
 Reduced mass
 Two-body problem in general relativity

Note

References 

-
Gravitational-wave astronomy